All Canadian may refer to:
All-Canadian Congress of Labour, Canadian national labour confederation
BioSteel All-Canadian Basketball Game, annual Canadian all-star game featuring high school basketball players
U Sports Football All-Canadian Team, best Canadian football players in U Sports at Canadian universities